Vincent Joseph Hines (September 14, 1912 – April 23, 1990) was an American prelate of the Roman Catholic Church who served as bishop of the Diocese of Norwich in Connecticut from 1960 to 1975.

Biography
Vincent Hines was born on September 14, 1912, in New Haven, Connecticut.  He was ordained to the priesthood in Paris for the Archdiocese of Hartford on May 2, 1937, by Cardinal Jean Verdier. He joined the US Army Chaplain Corps in 1942 and served in France after the Normandy invasion; Hines received a Bronze Star medal.

Bishop of Norwich 
On November 27, 1959, Hines was appointed the second bishop of the Diocese of Norwich by Pope John XXIII. He received his episcopal consecration on March 17, 1960, from Archbishop Henry O'Brien, with Bishops Bernard Flanagan and John Hackett serving as co-consecrators. 

During his tenure, Hines led a $1 million fundraising campaign for schools in the diocese.  He build Xavier High School in Middletown, Connecticut, for boys in 1963 and Mercy High School, also in Middletown, for girls in 1965. He also named the first nun to head a diocesan school system in Connecticut, and established a retirement program for priests. Hines attended the Second Vatican Council in Rome from 1962 to 1965.

On June 5, 1975, Pope Paul VI accepted Hines' resignation as bishop of the Diocese of Norwich. He then spent his retirement serving as chaplain to the School Sisters of Notre Dame in Norwich. Vincent Hines died in Hartford at St. Francis Hospital and Medical Center on April 23, 1990, at age 77.

See also

 Catholic Church hierarchy
 Catholic Church in the United States
 Historical list of the Catholic bishops of the United States
 List of Catholic bishops of the United States
 Lists of patriarchs, archbishops, and bishops

References

External links 
Roman Catholic Diocese of Norwich

1912 births
1990 deaths
Religious leaders from New Haven, Connecticut
Roman Catholic bishops of Norwich
Participants in the Second Vatican Council
World War II chaplains
United States Army chaplains
20th-century Roman Catholic bishops in the United States